Aspidorhynchiformes (from New Latin "shield-snout forms") is an extinct order of ray-finned fish. It contains only a single family, the Aspidorhynchidae. Members of the group are noted for their elongated, conical rostrums, of varying length, formed from fused premaxillae. They are generally interpreted as stem-group teleosts. The range of the group extends from the Middle Jurassic to the late Paleocene.

Taxonomic history
The order was described by Pieter Bleeker in 1859.

Aspidorhynchiformes has one family, which is divided into at least two genera:
 Order †Aspidorhynchiformes Bleeker 1859 [Aspidorhynchida; Aspidorhynchoidei Bleeker 1859]
 Family †Aspidorhynchidae Bleeker 1859 [Vinctiferidae Silva Santos 1990; Diphyodontidae Jordan 1923]
 Genus †Jonoichthys Gouiric-Cavalli 2015
 Genus ?†Ophirachis Costa 1854
 Genus †Platycerhynchus Costa 1864
 Genus †Pseudovinctifer Arratia 2015
 Genus †Richmondichthys Bartholomai 2004
 Genus †Aspidorhynchus Agassiz 1833 non Fitzinger 1843
 Genus †Belonostomus Agassiz 1834 [Dichelospondylus Costa 1856; Hemirhynchus Kner 1867 non Agassiz 1844 non Hodgson 1843; Diphyodus Lambe 1902] 
 Genus †Vinctifer Jordan 1920

Fossils range have been found in the United States, France, Italy, Russia, Saskatchewan, Alberta, North Dakota, Montana, Wyoming, and Uzbekistan.  These fossils range from 167.7mya (Aspidorhynchus) to 66 mya (Belonostomus longirostris).

Anatomy 

The most distinctive feature of the Aspidorhynchiformes are the elongated, tube-like rostrums, which are formed from fused premaxillary bones. The scales are lepidosteoid, similar to those of gars.

Taxonomy 
Aspidorhynchiformes have generally been recovered as basal members of Teleosteomorpha, more closely related to teleosts than to Holostei. They have often considered to have a sister group relationship with Pachycormiformes, another group of basal teleosteomorphs.

Evolutionary history 
The earliest known remains of the group are known from the Middle Jurassic of Europe, in what was then the western Tethys Ocean, which was likely the centre of their initial diversification, during the Late Jurassic they dispersed to the waters around the Caribbean, South America and Antarctica. During the Cretaceous they dispersed worldwide. The youngest members the group, belonging to Belonostomus went extinct during the late Paleocene.

References

 paleodb

Prehistoric ray-finned fish orders